This is a list of languages by total number of speakers.

It is difficult to define what constitutes a language as opposed to a dialect. For example, Chinese and Arabic are sometimes considered to be single languages, but each includes several mutually unintelligible varieties and so they are sometimes considered language families instead. Conversely, colloquial registers of Hindi and Urdu are almost completely mutually intelligible, and are sometimes classified as one language, Hindustani, instead of two separate languages. Such rankings should be used with caution, because it is not possible to devise a coherent set of linguistic criteria for distinguishing languages in a dialect continuum.

There is no single criterion for how much knowledge is sufficient to be counted as a second-language speaker. For example, English has about 450 million native speakers but, depending on the criterion chosen, can be said to have as many as 2 billion speakers.

There are also difficulties in obtaining reliable counts of speakers, which vary over time because of population change and language shift. In some areas, there is no reliable census data, the data is not current, or the census may not record languages spoken, or record them ambiguously. Sometimes speaker populations are exaggerated for political reasons, or speakers of minority languages may be under-reported in favor of a national language.

Top languages by population

Ethnologue (2022, 25th edition)
The following languages are listed as having 40 million or more total speakers in the 2022 edition of Ethnologue. Entries identified by Ethnologue as macrolanguages (such as Arabic, Persian, Malay, Pashto, Sindhi) are not included in this section.

Major Languages Spoken by Population Proportion 
The Central Intelligence Agency (CIA) estimates the ten most-spoken languages (L1 + L2) in 2022 as follow:

See also 

 Lingua franca
 Lists of languages
 List of languages by number of native speakers
 List of languages by the number of countries in which they are recognized as an official language
 Number of languages by country
 World language
 Languages used on the Internet
 Extinct language
 Official languages of the United Nations

Notes

References

External links